Guido Riccobelli (born 28 November 1987, Buenos Aires) is an Argentine handball player who plays for Italian team Handball Siena. He was born in Buenos Aires. He defended Argentina at the 2012 London Summer Olympics.

References

External links

1987 births
Living people
Argentine male handball players
Olympic handball players of Argentina
Handball players at the 2012 Summer Olympics
Sportspeople from Buenos Aires
21st-century Argentine people